Martha García Mejía (born May 30, 1962) is a Mexican former luchadora, or female professional wrestler best known under the ring name Martha Villalobos an active wrestling promoter, running a company named Reyes del Ring ("Kings of the Ring"). She is the daughter of professional wrestler Panchito Villalobos and the sister of retired wrestlers Johnny and Bobby Villalobos. She is a former two-time Mexican National Women's Champion as well as holding the Mexican National Women's Tag Team Championship with Pantera Sureña while working for Consejo Mundial de Lucha Libre (CMLL). While working for AAA she won the AAA Reina de Reinas Championship twice, first by defeating Reina de Reina Esther Moreno and later by winning the 2003 tournament.

Championships and accomplishments
AAA
AAA Reina de Reinas Championship (2 times)
Comision de Box y Lucha D.F.
Mexican National Women's Championship (2 times)
Mexican National Women's Tag Team Championship (1 time) – with Pantera Sureña
Federacion Internacional de Lucha Libre
FILL Women's Championship (1 time)
Independent circuit|Local championship
Northern Mexico Women's Championship (1 time)
Mexico State Women's Championship (1 time)

Lucha de Apuesta record

References

1962 births
Living people
Mexican female professional wrestlers
Professional wrestling promoters
Professional wrestlers from Mexico City
AAA Reina de Reinas Champions
Mexican National Women's Champions
20th-century professional wrestlers
21st-century professional wrestlers
Mexican National Women's Tag Team Champions